The Agasha Temple of Wisdom is a spiritualist group founded in 1943 by Richard Zenor. After the publication of James Crenshaw's book Telephone Between Two Worlds in 1950, in which both Zenor and the temple were prominently featured, the temple became more popular. Upon Zenor's death in 1978, Geary Salvat was chosen to lead the group.

References

Sources
 Leslie Shepard (Editor) Encyclopedia of Occultism and Parapsychology Volume 1 A-L, The Gale Group, 2001 
 J. Gordon Melton Religious Bodies in the U.S.: A Dictionary, Routledge, 1992  (although this is a listing only)
LeRoy E. Froom, Professor of Historical Theology, Andrews University, Occult Forces of Both East and West, Ministry, International Journal for Pastors
Gordon Collier Make Your Own World (3 volumes), Book of Destiny, 1955 (no ISBN)

Further reading
Crenshaw, James. Telephone Between Two Worlds. Los Angeles: DeVorss, 1950.
Eisen, William. Agasha, Master of Wisdom. Marina del Rey, Calif.: DeVorss, 1977.
Eisen, William. The English Cabala. 2 vols. Marina del Rey, Calif.: DeVorss, 1980–82.
Eisen, William, ed. The Agashan Discourse. Marina del Rey, Calif.: DeVorss, 1978.
Zenor, Richard. Maggie Answers You. San Diego: Philip J. Hastings, 1965.

External links
 Website

Organizations based in Montana
Religious organizations established in 1943
Spiritualist communities